Erpingham is a village and civil parish in the English] county of Norfolk. In 1935, Erpingham parish was merged with Calthorpe to form the parish of Erpingham with Calthorpe.

History
Erpingham's name is of Anglo-Saxon origin and derives from the Old English for the homestead or village of Eorp's people.

There is archaeological evidence to suggest Erpingham was the site of two Roman settlements, one of which suggests a military or religious function. Furthermore, Roman artefacts, including coins, brooches and a quern-stone, have been discovered close to the village.

In the Domesday Book, Erpingham is listed as a settlement of 27 households in the hundred of South Erpingham. In 1086, the village was divided between the East Anglian estates of Roger Bigot, St Benet's Abbey, Drogo de la Beuvrière and Ranulf brother of Ilger.

Erpingham Watermill is first recorded in the mid-Eighteenth Century as one of the smallest mills in Norfolk, drawing on the Scarrow Beck for its power. The watermill was gutted by fire in 1965 and was subsequently demolished. Erpingham Windmill dates from the late-Fourteenth Century and is a private residence today.

During the Second World War, an artillery emplacement and bunker were built in the village for use of the Home Guard.

Geography
According to the 2011 Census, Erpingham and Calthorpe have a combined population of 700 residents living in 315 households.

Erpingham falls within the constituency of North Norfolk and is represented at Parliament by Duncan Baker MP of the Conservative Party. For the purposes of local government, the parish falls within the district of North Norfolk.

Church of the Assumption of the Virgin Mary
Erpingham's parish church is dedicated to Saint Mary and has a nave dating from the Fourteenth Century and a chancel from the Fifteenth Century. The font was originally placed in St Benedict's Church, Norwich, but was transferred to Erpingham after St. Benedict's was destroyed in the Norwich Blitz, the font is a relic of the Nineteenth Century. The church also holds a good example of a Fourteenth Century brass memorial dedicated to Sir John de Erpingham, an English soldier present at the Battle of Agincourt, and installed by his son, Sir Thomas Erpingham. The Church of the Assumption has good examples of British and Continental stained-glass, largely copied from examples in Blickling Hall and restored in the Twenty-first Century by King & Son.

Amenities
Erpingham's 'Spread Eagle' public house has stood on its current site since the late eighteenth century. In its long history, the Spread Eagle has been owned by Watney & Mann Brewery and Woodforde's and was briefly known as the Erpingham Arms from 2011 to 2017.

Notable residents
 Sir Thomas Erpingham (1347-1428)- English soldier and administrator
 Steve Wright (b.1958)- English serial killer

War Memorial
Erpingham's war memorial takes the form of a shaft topped with a Celtic cross above a plinth located in St. Mary's Churchyard. The memorial lists the following names for the First World War:

 Gnr. John C. Nichols (1885-1918), 251st Brigade, Royal Field Artillery
 Pvt. George Warne (1893-1918), 1/6th Battalion, Durham Light Infantry
 Pvt. Albert Lambert (d.1917), 1/9th Battalion, Durham L. I.
 Pvt. Alfred E. Allard (1888-1918), 13th Battalion, Durham L.I.
 Pvt. S. Jack Burgess (1896-1916), 2nd Battalion, Royal Norfolk Regiment
 Pvt. John Ives (d.1917), 1/5th Battalion, Royal Norfolk Regt.
 Pvt. S. William Bean (d.1917), 9th Battalion, Royal Norfolk Regt.
 Pvt. Donald D. Daniels (1895-1918), 1/4th Battalion, Northumberland Fusiliers
 Sh-Smt. Herbert J. Burgess (1871-1916), 1st Company, Royal Army Service Corps
 Bertie Green
 Maurice West

And, the following for the Second World War:
 L-Cpl. Harold Jickells (1919-1942), Royal Engineers
 Pvt. Noel Dennis (1919-1943), 4th Battalion, Royal Norfolk Regiment

Gallery

References

Further reading
 Vigar, J. (2021). Churches of Norfolk. Stroud: Amberley Publishing.

External links

 
Villages in Norfolk
Civil parishes in Norfolk
North Norfolk